Guadalupe Canyon Hot Springs (also known as Cañon de Guadalupe Hot Springs) are a grouping of geothermal springs located near Mexicali, Baja California, Mexico. The hot mineral water is discharged through a number of springs that divert the flow through man-made aqueducts into rock and concrete pools. The hot springs were used by indigenous people for many years before more recent settlers arrived.

Water profile and geography
The alkaline water emerges at 125°F (52°C). The springs are located in Sierra de Juárez in the Cañon de Guadalupe. There are ancient petroglyphs in the area, a cave used by ancient indigenous peoples, a mud bath, and hiking, camping and rock climbing areas.

See also
 List of hot springs in the United States
 List of hot springs in the world

References

Hot springs of Mexico